Axel Jørgensen (1881–1947) was a Danish composer.

Works
 Romance for Trombone and Piano, Op.21
 Suite for Trombone and Piano, Op.22 (Dedicated to Anton Hansen)
 Caprice Orientale for trumpet and piano
 Brass Quintet (1942)

External links

See also
List of Danish composers

References

1881 births
1947 deaths
Danish composers
Male composers
20th-century male musicians